Trpísty is a municipality and village in Tachov District in the Plzeň Region of the Czech Republic. It has about 300 inhabitants.

Administrative parts
The village of Sviňomazy is an administrative part of Trpísty.

Sights
Trpísty is noted for Château Trpísty, a late baroque manor house built in 1723–1729.

References

Villages in Tachov District